Tasting Table (incorporated as TDT Media Inc.) is a digital media company focused on food and drink. The brand's website and email newsletter report on food and drink trends in the categories of dining, wine, cocktails, cooking and food travel. In addition to publishing original articles, photos and videos, Tasting Table hosts events including the Lobster Rumble, held annually in New York and Los Angeles.

History 

Tasting Table was founded in 2008 by Geoff Bartakovics and John McDonald, with backing from The Pilot Group, a private equity firm established by Bob Pittman.

Lobster Rumble 

Since 2010, Tasting Table has hosted an annual lobster roll competition, now called Tasting Table’s Lobster Rumble. Originally called the "Lobster Roll Claw-Off" and hosted only in New York City, the event now occurs annually in New York City in June of each year and moves to Los Angeles in August. The event brings lobster roll purveyors from across the country together to compete for the title of “Fan Favorite,” selected by event attendees, or “Editor’s Choice,” selected by Tasting Table editors.  The 2014 New York Lobster Rumble hosted 20 competitors and 2000 attendees, while the Los Angeles Lobster Rumble included 13 competitors and 1000 attendees.

DINE by Tasting Table

In 2015, Tasting Table acquired Flavour, the restaurant discovery app that the New York Times once called “powerful” and “eye catching”. Tasting Table subsequently relaunched the app as DINE by Tasting Table. DINE is a curated restaurant finder that makes it easy to discover the perfect dining destination for every situation. While Tasting Table editors have selected the restaurants included in each of the app's eight cities, DINE uniquely aggregates reviews from nearly 30 local and national publications, critics and epicurean websites. Users can quickly survey multiple viewpoints before deciding where to eat out.

References 

Online marketplaces of the United States
Websites about food and drink